Stephen Harold Fields (January 1, 1941 – October 29, 2009) was a Major League Baseball umpire who worked in the National League from  to , wearing uniform number 27 during his career. Fields umpired 373 Major League games.

Early life and career
Fields worked railroad and postal jobs as well as working as an oil driver in Alexandria, Virginia. At the same time he was also working on the side as a high school umpire, before pursuing officiating as a professional. Fields worked 14 years in the minor leagues and was brought up to the National League (along with Dave Pallone, Lanny Harris, and Fred Brocklander) during the 1979 Major League Baseball Umpires Strike as a replacement. As such, he was not permitted to join the Major League Umpires Association.  When the strike was settled, Fields and the others were allowed to remain on the staff as long as their performance was satisfactory. After the 1981 season, Fields was fired for "low performance ratings" and "failure to show improvement", the first of the four replacements to leave (Harris was fired in 1985, Pallone technically resigned in 1988, and Brocklander retired in 1992).

Fields filed a $1 million lawsuit against MLB because of his firing and claiming that his performance suffered due to the "ostracism and antagonism" from other umpires due to his "scab" status.  After he left baseball, he worked as a high school umpire and as a truck driver.

Death
Fields died on October 29, 2009, at the age of 68.

References

1941 births
2009 deaths
Major League Baseball umpires
Sportspeople from Virginia